David Carson is a British director of television and film.

Career
Carson's first work in directing was in the British theatre scene and on British television. He directed an episode of the British soap opera Coronation Street. Carson sought to move to the United States in order to work in the American film scene, and prior to travelling, his agent arranged an interview for him with the producers of Star Trek: The Next Generation. However, he had never heard of Star Trek, and at his agent's suggestion, he rented some videos in order to conduct research. Once in the United States, he met with Rick Berman and David Livingston and was hired to direct the episode "The Enemy".

The producers liked the different British style of directing and scene blocking that Carson brought to the set, as it was a style that the show hadn't previously used. He was subsequently brought back for another episode, but when he arrived for the first of eight days of preparation he was told that Whoopi Goldberg was available, and so they would like him to direct one of the scripts that she appeared in. This turned out to be "Yesterday's Enterprise", which was developed from an outline to script during the eight days of preparation prior to shooting. His other episodes of TNG included "The Next Phase" and the second part of "Redemption". He was approached by Rick Berman to direct the opening episode of Star Trek: Deep Space Nine, "Emissary". He later explained that there was some apprehension prior to the launch of the series because it was the first without Gene Roddenberry, the producer. Carson had to ensure that he stayed within the pilot's budget, and to deal with the differences between TNG and DS9 while ensuring that it appealed to the fans. His other Deep Space Nine episodes included "Dax", "Move Along Home" and "The Alternate".

Carson's final work for Star Trek was his first feature film, and the first film in which the TNG characters appeared, Star Trek Generations. During the making of the film, he fought for the death of James T. Kirk to be changed from the original scripted version as he felt that it was "ignominious". Following the poor scores the scene received at public test screenings, the ending was re-written and Carson led the re-filming at the original location. His directing work on Generations inspired cast member Jonathan Frakes to seek to direct the following Star Trek movie, Star Trek: First Contact.

After his work on the Star Trek franchise, he worked on the miniseries The 10th Kingdom, as well as shows such as Smallville and One Tree Hill. Whilst on The 10th Kingdom, he worked alongside fellow director Herbert Wise as the series was filmed for six days a week for six months. He returned to his homeland in 2000, to film In His Life: The John Lennon Story. In 2002, he directed an adaptation of Stephen King's novel Carrie. During the same year, he was also executive producer for the pilot of Odyssey 5, which had been written by Manny Coto, former showrunner of Star Trek: Enterprise.

Filmography

Television

Film 
 Star Trek Generations (1994)
 Letters from a Killer (1998)
 Carrie (2002)
 Unstoppable (2004)

References

External links
 
 

British film directors
British television directors
Living people
Science fiction film directors
English film directors
English television directors
Year of birth missing (living people)